Katy Brand's Big Ass Show is a British comedy programme on ITV2.

The show features comedian Katy Brand in skits of real life situations and stereotypes, as well and celebrities such as Amy Winehouse, Lily Allen, Lady Gaga, Angelina Jolie, Adele and Kate Winslet.

The second series began on 2 September 2008. The series was carried in Canada on CBC's bold channel as of October 2008, and in Portugal on RTP2, each Sunday latenights at 11:50 pm, on the "Britcom" strand (the first non-BBC series to be broadcast on this strand).

Her comic clips in the second series include Princess Beatrice of York, Kate Moss, Leona Lewis, Jesus, the Queen and Secret Diary of a Call Girl.

A Christmas special called Katy Brand's Big Ass Songs of 2008 aired on 13 December 2008.

The third and final series ran from 10 September 2009 to 15 October 2009.

When Katy appeared on Justin Lee Collins: Good Times she stated that there would be no more series of Katy Brand's Big Ass Show and that she would end the show with a live tour throughout April  2010.

Ensemble cast
Katy Brand
Katherine Parkinson
David Armand
Margaret Cabourn-Smith
Zoe Gardner
Kobna Holdbrook-Smith
Rufus Jones
Tom Knight
James Lance
Joan Linder
Joanna Neary
Rupert Russell
Dave Skinner
Ian Stone
Nick Tanner
Velile Tshabalala
Guido Adorni
Di Botcher
James Doherty
Michael Fenton Stevens
Alexander Kirk
Laura Lawson
Barunka O'Shaughnessy
Daniel Taylor
Feri Tezcan
Bhasker Patel
Renton Skinner
Bindya Solanki
Sam Spedding
Elliott Tiney

References

External links

Guardian article

2007 British television series debuts
2000s British television sketch shows
ITV sketch shows
2009 British television series endings
English-language television shows